was a Japanese daimyō of the Edo period. He served in a variety of positions in the Tokugawa shogunate, including wakadoshiyori, rōjū, and Kyoto Shoshidai.　Around 1722 he was appointed by Shogun Yoshimune as the first kanjōkata (勘定方) in charge of putting the Bakufu's financial affairs in order. By 1735, this had become the largest government office.

After the 47 rōnin incident, Tadayuki was given custody of nine of the Akō men: Hazama Jūjirō, Okada Suke'emon, Yatō Emonshichi, Muramatsu Sandayū, Mase Magokurō, Kayano Wasuke, Yokogawa Sanpei, Muramatsu Jirōzaemon, and Kanzaki Yogorō.

References

|-

Daimyo
Kyoto Shoshidai
1669 births
1731 deaths
Wakadoshiyori
Rōjū
Mizuno clan